Josh Stolberg is an American film director, screenwriter, and photographer. He won the Seashore Award and the Queen Spirit Award as a director of the film The Life Coach.  He also wrote and directed the 2005 film Kids in America, and made a cameo appearance as a security guard in the film. Stolberg is the screenwriter of the film Good Luck Chuck, starring Dane Cook, Jessica Alba and Dan Fogler. He also co-wrote the scripts for Man-Witch (directed by Todd Phillips), the remakes Piranha 3D (directed by Alexandre Aja) and Sorority Row, the adaptation of the book The Spellman Files, produced by Laura Ziskin, as well as the adaptation of the book The Candy Shop War. He was also a part of the writing team for the first two episodes of Book 1: Water of  Avatar: The Last Airbender.

Filmography

Co-producer
 Piranha 3DD (2012)

References

External links

1971 births
American male screenwriters
Living people
Writers from Columbia, South Carolina
USC School of Cinematic Arts alumni
Film directors from South Carolina
Screenwriters from South Carolina
Comedy film directors
Parody film directors
American parodists